Ravand-e Vosta (also Romanized as Rāvand-e Vosţá; also known as Rāvand and Rāvand-e Soflá) is a village in Shaban Rural District, in the Central District of Nahavand County, Hamadan Province, Iran. At the 2006 census, its population was 47, in 11 families.

References 

Populated places in Nahavand County